The European Working Group for Legionella Infections (EWGLI) was formed in 1986. Its members are scientists with an interest in improving knowledge and information on the epidemiological and microbiological (clinical and environmental) aspects of legionnaires' disease. This is achieved through international surveillance of the disease, as well as developments in diagnosis, management and treatment methods.

EWGLI is based at the Health Protection Agency - Centre for Infections, Department of Respiratory Diseases (Legionella Section), 61 Colindale Avenue, London NW9 5EQ, United Kingdom

External quality assessment schemes
External Quality Assessment (EQA) schemes are an important component in the operation of EWGLI. The following schemes are available:
 Typing and Identification Schemes
 Urinary Antigen Scheme
 Water Scheme
 Sequencing Proficiency Panels

See also
 Microbiology
 Environmental microbiology
 Legionella
 Legionellosis
 Copper-silver ionization

References

External links
  EWGLI website 

Bacterial diseases
Microbiology organizations